Nai Duniya is a 1942 Bollywood film directed by Abdul Rashid Kardar and starring P. Jairaj, Shobhana Samarth, and Mazhar Khan. Suraiya sang her first song; "Boot Karun Mai Polish, Babu" with Naushad as M.D. in this film.

References

External links
 

1942 films
1940s Hindi-language films
Films directed by A. R. Kardar
Indian black-and-white films